Christ Church is a small Gothic Revival Anglican church located in Ballyhooly, County Cork, Ireland. It was completed in 1881. It is dedicated to Jesus Christ. It is part of the Fermoy Union of Parishes in the Diocese of Cork, Cloyne, and Ross.

History 

Christ Church is located on the site of an earlier church which was completed in 1774 and designed by John Morrison.

The present building was founded in 1881, on the Convamore estate, which was the estate of the earls of Listowel. The cornerstone was laid on 21 April 1880 by Lady Listowel. It was consecrated on either the 22 or 23 December 1881, by Bishop Robert Gregg. It was founded primarily at the expense of William Hare, 3rd Earl of Listowel.

Architecture 
William Henry Hill designed the church. It is built using stone cute form Bridgetown Abbey in Castletownroche. The church features a four-bay nave, which is built in the Early English style. The churchyard holds the Listowel Mausoleum, constructed in 1846, which is built in the Gothic Revival style, and is composed of ashlar stone.

References

Notes

Sources 

 

Architecture in Ireland
Churches in the Diocese of Cork, Cloyne and Ross
19th-century Church of Ireland church buildings
Gothic Revival church buildings in the Republic of Ireland
19th-century churches in the Republic of Ireland